Lingang Avenue is a station on Line 16 of the Shanghai Metro in Shanghai, China. The station is located in the center of Nanhui New City. From here, the Universities Shanghai Maritime University and Shanghai Ocean University can be reached by bus.

Since 1 October 2018, to accommodate the openings of Haichang Ocean Park which stands close to the station, all trains served (including rapid services, except express services) stop at this station.

The station has 3 tracks, one island platform, and one side platform. The inner island platform is not in service. Trains heading to Longyang Road use the outer island platform, whilst trains towards Dishui Lake use the side platform. This station utilizes the same platform layout as one of its neighbouring stations, Shuyuan, on the same line.

References

External links

Railway stations in Shanghai
Line 16, Shanghai Metro
Shanghai Metro stations in Pudong
Railway stations in China opened in 2013